Hajiwala is a village in the district Gujrat, Pakistan.

References

Villages in Gujrat District